The Tasakili River is a tributary of the Stikine River, flowing southeast out of the Boundary Ranges on the United States side of the range to join that river in Canada, just before the Stikine transits the Alaska-British Columbia border.

The river's course flows down the east flank of that mountain.

References

Rivers of the Boundary Ranges
Tributaries of the Stikine River
International rivers of North America
Rivers of Alaska
Rivers of Prince of Wales–Hyder Census Area, Alaska
Rivers of Unorganized Borough, Alaska